Manuel de Godoy di Bassano, 3rd Prince de Godoy di Bassano, (in full), (31 October 1835 - 14 April 1896) was a Spanish and Italian aristocrat.

He was born in Paris, the son of Manuel de Godoy di Bassano, 2nd Prince de Godoy di Bassano and of Lady María Carolina Crowe y O'Donovan O'Neill, Dama de Honor de la Emperatriz Eugenia de Montijo. He was 3rd and last Principe de Godoy di Bassano, 3rd Conde de Castillo Fiel with a Coat of Arms of de Tudó (Royal Order of 21 December 1871, Knight of the Order of St. John of Jerusalem and Knight First Class of the Order of Philip the Magnanimous of the Grand Duchy of Hesse and by Rhine (formerly Darmstadt), etc.

Manuel de Godoy di Bassano married first in 1856 with Doña María del Pilar de Sola y Fuentes, with issue died in his lifetime, and married second, in Pamplona on 2 March  1878, with Doña Rosina Carolina Victoria Nöel y Stoltz, Freifrau [Baroness] von Ketschendorf und Stoltzenau, without issue.

Sources

1835 births
1896 deaths
19th-century Spanish nobility
19th-century Italian nobility
Manuel 03
Manuel 03